Distortion synthesis is a group of sound synthesis techniques which modify existing sounds to produce more complex sounds (or timbres), usually by using non-linear circuits or mathematics.

While some synthesis methods achieve sonic complexity by using many oscillators, distortion methods create a frequency spectrum which has many more components than oscillators.

Some distortion techniques are: FM synthesis, waveshaping synthesis, and discrete summation formulas.

FM synthesis
Frequency modulation synthesis distorts the carrier frequency of an oscillator by modulating it with another signal. The distortion can be controlled by means of a modulation index.

The method known as phase distortion synthesis is similar to FM.

Waveshaping synthesis
Waveshaping synthesis changes an original waveform by responding to its amplitude in a non-linear fashion. It can generate a bandwidth-limited spectrum, and can be continuously controlled with an index.

The clipping caused by overdriving an audio amplifier is a simple example of this method, changing a sine wave into a square-like wave.  (Note that direct digital implementations suffer from aliasing of the clipped signal's infinite number of harmonics, however.)

Discrete summation formulas
DSF synthesis refers to algorithmic synthesis methods which use mathematical formulas to sum, or add together, many numbers to achieve a desired wave shape. This powerful method allows, for example, synthesizing a 3-formant voice in a manner similar to FM voice synthesis. DSF allows the synthesis of harmonic and inharmonic, band-limited or unlimited spectra, and can be controlled by an index. As Roads points out, by reducing digital synthesis of complex spectra to a few parameters, DSF can be much more economical.

Notable users
Jean-Claude Risset was one notable pioneer in the adoption of distortion methods.

References

External links 

Sound synthesis types